Mohammad Damadi (born 1979, Sari, Iran) is a member of the ninth and tenth terms of the Iran Islamic parliament and Deputy Minister of Industry, Mining and Trade of Iran and a member of the third term of the Islamic Council of Management of Sari.

References

Iranian Majlis Representatives
1979 births
Living people
Iranian politicians
People from Mazandaran Province